Ho Hoo Tan is an album by the Hong Kong Cantopop group Twins. It was released in September 2006 by EEG.

CD:
 Hot Vacation(熱浪假期)
 Pink Guitar (桃紅結他)
 You're not a good lover (你不是好情人) - Twins
 I decided to go away (我決定走了) 
 I don't save (我不儲錢) 
 Always think i'm right (自以為是) 
 Eyes see but heart doesn't feel (眼看心勿動) 
 Summer Rain (夏雨) 
 World has twins (天下有雙)
 Don't marry to bad guys (非君不嫁) - Gillian Chung
 You're not a good lover (你不是好情人) - Charlene Choi
 "Burn It Up" <8 分鐘> (Medley – 八十塊環遊世界/一時無兩)

DVD:
 Hot Vacation(熱浪假期)
 Pink Guitar (桃紅結他)
 You're not a good lover (你不是好情人) - Twins
 I decided to go away (我決定走了) 
 I don't save (我不儲錢)

2006 albums
Twins (group) albums